A Logician Devil  or The Logician Devil  is an illustration of Lucifer created by Salvador Dalí referencing Dante Alighieri's Divine Comedy. The image is one of 100 illustrations made by Dalí between 1950 and 1960 inspired by the Divine Comedy.

References

Paintings by Salvador Dalí